Acalyptris fuscofascia is a moth of the family Nepticulidae. It was described by Scoble in 1980. It is known from Zimbabwe.

References

Nepticulidae
Endemic fauna of Zimbabwe
Moths of Africa
Moths described in 1980